Beawar District is a proposed district of the state of Rajasthan in North western India. The city of Beawar will be the district headquarters. The district was previously part of Ajmer district.

References 

Districts of Rajasthan